Naagamalai Azhagi is a 1962 Indian Tamil-language film directed by G. Viswanathan. The film stars M. R. Radha and C. Leela. The film contains dance sequences by Sathyavathi and Rajeshwari in Eastmancolor.

Plot

Cast 
The list is adapted from the book Thiraikalanjiyam Part 2.

Male cast
M. R. Radha
Kallapart Natarajan
Nagesh
V. S. Raghavan
S. S. Sivasooriyan
M. C. Chokkalingam
Ki. Na. Kadhiroli
C. L. Anandan 

Female cast
C. Leela
Gemini Chandra
Manorama
Sathiyavathi
Rajeswari

Production 
The film was produced by Madheswari Films and was directed by G. Viswanathan. Story and dialogues were written by Ki. Naa. Kadhiroli.

Soundtrack 
Music was composed by S. P. Kothandapani. T. A. Mothi composed music for one song Vandu Vandhu Mella Mella. Lyrics were penned by Elangkavi Muthukoothan, Pulavar Naga. Shanmugam, Chittibabu and Ku. Ma. Krishnan.

References

External links 
 

1960s Tamil-language films